Geophis damiani is a species of snake in the family Colubridae. The species is endemic to Yoro Department, Honduras, where it is only found in a small region of the forest.

Etymology
The species G. damiani is named in honor of Damian Almendarez, a friend of the describers of the species.

Habitat

Description
The dorsal scales of G. damiani are arranged in 15 rows throughout the length of its body. Other species of Geophis which occur in its geographic range have 17 dorsal scale rows.

Behavior
G. damiani is terrestrial and fossorial.

Reproduction
G. damiani is oviparous.

References

Further reading
McCranie JR, Castaneda FE (2004). "Notes on the second specimens of Geophis damiani Wilson, McCranie, and Williams and Rhadinaea tolpanorum Holm and Cruz D. (Colubridae)". Herpetological Review 35 (4): 341.
Wilson LD, McCranie JR, Williams KL (1998). "A new species of Geophis of the sieboldi group (Reptilia: Squamata: Colubridae) from Northern Honduras". Proceedings of the Biological Society of Washington 111: 410–417. (Geophis damiani, new species).

Geophis
Snakes of Central America
Reptiles of Honduras
Endemic fauna of Honduras
Taxa named by James Randall McCranie
Taxa named by Kenneth L. Williams
Reptiles described in 1998